The Human Voice is a 2020 Spanish drama short film written and directed by Pedro Almodóvar, based on the play of the same name by Jean Cocteau. It stars Tilda Swinton and is Almodóvar's first film acted in English.

The film had its world premiere at the 77th Venice International Film Festival on 3 September 2020. It was released in Spain on 21 October 2020 by Wanda Films and Avalon.

Cast
 Tilda Swinton

Production
In February 2020, it was announced Tilda Swinton had joined the cast of the film, with Pedro Almodóvar directing from a screenplay he wrote based upon the play of the same name by Jean Cocteau.

Principal photography was set to begin in April 2020, but was delayed due to the COVID-19 pandemic. Principal photography began on 16 July 2020. Production concluded on 27 July 2020.

Release
The Human Voice had its world premiere at the 77th Venice International Film Festival on 3 September 2020. Later that month, Sony Pictures Classics acquired American distribution rights to the film. It also screened at the New York Film Festival on 24 September 2020, and at the BFI London Film Festival on 17 October 2020. It was released in Spain on 21 October 2020 by Wanda Films and Avalon. In the United States, the film was released in select theatres on 12 March 2021. Pathé acquired the UK rights to the short film, and released it on 19 May 2021 (originally given a 7 November 2020 release) through Walt Disney Studios Motion Pictures via 20th Century Studios and Buena Vista International; it was the last film released by Pathé under the current Fox–Disney deal at the time, as the company would sign a new deal with Warner Bros. in June of that year.

Critical reception
 

Peter Bradshaw of The Guardian gave the film four out of five stars, describing it as "a tale of someone isolated, regretful, anxious, unable to tell whether current arrangements are contingent or permanent, retreating into gestures of self-immolating despair."

References

External links 
 
 

2020 films
2020 drama films
2020 short films
2020s English-language films
2020s Spanish films
Drama short films
El Deseo films
English-language Spanish films
Films based on works by Jean Cocteau
Films directed by Pedro Almodóvar
Films produced by Agustín Almodóvar
Films scored by Alberto Iglesias
Spanish drama films
Spanish films based on plays
Spanish short films